Noon (orig. title Podne) is a 1968 Yugoslav film directed by Mladomir Puriša Đorđević.

References

External links

1968 films
Yugoslav romantic drama films
Films set in Belgrade
Films shot in Belgrade